Richard Godolphin Walmesley Chaloner, 1st Baron Gisborough (né Long; 12 October 1856 – 23 January 1938) was a British soldier and politician. He was a Conservative Member of Parliament (MP) from 1895 to 1900 and 1910 to 1917, and a member of the House of Lords from 1917 until his death in 1938.

Career
Chaloner was the son of Richard Penruddocke Long, an MP from 1859 to 1868, and younger brother of The 1st Viscount Long. His family owned Rood Ashton House in Wiltshire and had lived in the county since the end of the 14th century. Chaloner's maternal grandfather was William Dick, a member for Wicklow from 1852 to 1880. In 1888, he assumed the surname of Chaloner by Royal licence, this was in accordance with the will of his maternal great-uncle Admiral Thomas Chaloner, who had inherited the Gisborough estate and Gisborough Hall through his mother, a descendant of Robert de Brus.

Chaloner was educated at Winchester College and the Royal Military College, Sandhurst, after which he was commissioned a second lieutenant in the 3rd Hussars on 30 January 1878. He served in the Second Anglo-Afghan War 1879–80, and was promoted to lieutenant on 1 July 1881. Promotion to captain came on 1 July 1887, followed by brevet appointments as major and lieutenant-colonel on 10 February 1894. He transferred to the Reserve of Officers, and became lieutenant-colonel in command of the 1st Wiltshire Volunteer Rifles. Following the outbreak of the Second Boer War in October 1899, many volunteer officers were commissioned as part of the Imperial Yeomanry which was created in December 1899. Chaloner was appointed in command of the 1st (Wiltshire) Company of the 1st Battalion, and left Liverpool for South Africa on the SS Cymric in March 1900.

Richard Chaloner was first elected to Parliament for Westbury in the 1895 general election. At the next general election in 1900, he was defeated by the Liberal candidate John Fuller. In the January 1910 general election, Chaloner was re-elected to Parliament succeeding the Liberal MP J. E. B. Seely in the constituency of Liverpool Abercromby. He retained this seat until 18 June 1917, when he was made Steward of the Chiltern Hundreds, a post that expelled him from the Commons, thus effectively resigning from the Commons. On 23 June 1917, he was made the Baron Gisborough, of Cleveland in the County of York, and became a member of the House of Lords. A by-election was held in Liverpool Abercromby to replace him. Lord Gisborough died in 1938 in Cleveland, aged 81, and was succeeded in the barony by his second son, Thomas.

Family
In 1882, he married Margaret Brocklesby Davis (died 1941) and they had two sons and four daughters. Their elder son, Richard, died in France in 1917 while guarding German prisoners of war.

Arms

Notes

References 

 
 
 Kidd, Charles, Williamson, David (editors). Debrett's Peerage and Baronetage (1990 edition). New York: St Martin's Press, 1990.

Further reading 
Inheriting the Earth: The Long Family's 500 Year Reign in Wiltshire; Cheryl Nicol

External links 
 

1856 births
1938 deaths
3rd The King's Own Hussars officers
Barons in the Peerage of the United Kingdom
British Army personnel of the Second Boer War
British military personnel of the Second Anglo-Afghan War
Deputy Lieutenants of the North Riding of Yorkshire
Chaloner, Richard
Richard Chaloner, 1st Baron Gisborough
People from Wiltshire
Chaloner, Richard
Chaloner, Richard
UK MPs who were granted peerages
People educated at Westminster School, London
Graduates of the Royal Military College, Sandhurst
Barons created by George V